Gérard Lelièvre (born 13 November 1949 in Laval, Mayenne) is a retired male race walker from France, who competed in three consecutive Summer Olympics during his career, starting in 1976.

Achievements

References

1949 births
Living people
People from Laval, Mayenne
French male racewalkers
Olympic athletes of France
Athletes (track and field) at the 1976 Summer Olympics
Athletes (track and field) at the 1980 Summer Olympics
Athletes (track and field) at the 1984 Summer Olympics
Sportspeople from Mayenne
Mediterranean Games gold medalists for France
Mediterranean Games medalists in athletics
Athletes (track and field) at the 1979 Mediterranean Games
Athletes (track and field) at the 1983 Mediterranean Games
World Athletics Indoor Championships winners